Chelsea Quinn Yarbro (born September 15, 1942) is an American writer.  She is known for her series of historical horror novels about the vampire Count Saint-Germain.

Biography
Yarbro was born in Berkeley, California. She attended Berkeley schools through high school followed by three years at San Francisco State College (now University).

In November 1969 she married Donald Simpson and divorced in February 1982. She has no children.

Writing for over 45 years, Yarbro has worked in a wide variety of genres, from science fiction to westerns, from young adult adventure to historical horror. She is the author of over 70 novels and numerous short stories.  In addition to the Count Saint-Germain novels, she also has published numerous volumes in a popular series of channeled wisdom from the entity Michael in the Messages from Michael series.

Yarbro's contribution to the horror genre has been recognised in a variety of ways: she was named a Grand Master at the World Horror Convention in 2003, and in 2005 the International Horror Guild named her a "Living Legend". She has received the Knightly Order of the Brasov Citadel from the Transylvanian Society of Dracula. In 2009 the Horror Writers' Association presented Yarbro with the Bram Stoker Lifetime Achievement Award.  In 2014, she was honored with the World Fantasy Award for Life Achievement.  Additionally, two of her novels, The Palace (1979) and Ariosto (1980) were nominated for the World Fantasy Award, neither winning.

In 2016, she reported that on average, she wrote three to four books and one or two short stories and/or essays a year. She wrote six hours per day, six days per week except when traveling. Five days a week she spent three to four hours doing research.

Aside from writing, she has worked as a cartographer, has read tarot cards and palms, and has composed music, all of which she continues to do. Over the years she has studied seven instruments, voice, and musical theory: composition, voice, and piano have continued to be active interests for her. The newsletter, Yclept Yarbro, about her and her writings has been published since 1995 by Lindig Hall Harris. She played a major role in popularizing The Eye of Argon, a novella that became part of widespread science fiction convention reading game.

Pseudonyms
 Quinn Fawcett (her projects with Bill Fawcett)
 Trystam Kith (two-volume Trouble in the Forest series featuring vicious vampires)
 Terry Nelson Bonner (vol. 5 in The Making of Australia series)
 T. C. F. Hopkins (non-fiction history)
 Camille Gabor (high fantasy "Nimuar's Loss," Book One of "The Vildecaz Talents")
 Vanessa Pryor (romance; one title: Taste of Wine)

The Michael teachings 

Messages from Michael is the first in a series of four books that chronicles a three-decade-long "conversation" between a group of friends surrounding Sarah Chambers (1937≠1998) and a channeled, spiritual teaching entity that has come to be known as Michael. As of September 2013 this conversation continues, as the Michael group continues to conduct closed sessions in the San Francisco Bay Area. A core concept of the teachings is "all choices made are equally valid."

Chelsea Quinn Yarbro's book presented a heavily fictionalized version of Sarah Chambers' group, identifying her under the pseudonym of Jessica Lansing. Yarbro published three more books on the subject, containing edited channeling transcripts as well as additional background material.

Bibliography

Footnotes

References

External links
 
 
  
 Quinn Fawcett (joint pseudonym of Yarbro and Bill Fawcett) at LC Authorities, with 12 records, and at WorldCat

1942 births
Living people
20th-century American novelists
21st-century American novelists
American science fiction writers
American fantasy writers
American horror writers
Western (genre) writers
American women short story writers
American women novelists
Pseudonymous women writers
Women science fiction and fantasy writers
Writers from Berkeley, California
Women horror writers
World Fantasy Award-winning writers
20th-century American women writers
21st-century American women writers
Channellers
20th-century American short story writers
21st-century American short story writers
20th-century pseudonymous writers
21st-century pseudonymous writers